Ray Comfort (born 5 December 1949) is a New Zealand-born Christian minister and evangelist who lives in the United States. Comfort started Living Waters Publications, as well as the ministry The Way of the Master, in Bellflower, California, and has written several books.

Early life
According to Comfort's autobiography, his parents put "Methodist" on his birth certificate but he was given no religious instruction as a child. Comfort identifies himself as both Christian and Jewish.

Career
In 1989, Comfort accepted an invitation to join the pastoral staff at the non-denominational Calvary Chapel in Southern California.

The Way of the Master ministry
In the mid-1990s Comfort persuaded Kirk Cameron, star of the cancelled hit sitcom Growing Pains, to become an evangelist.  In 2002, the pair formed an organization called The Way of the Master, with the intention of teaching the church to more effectively preach the message of evangelical Christianity.

Comfort says that evangelism is the main reason the Christian Church exists and that many of the evangelistic methods used over the last century have produced false conversions to Christianity. Comfort often uses the Ten Commandments to speak about sin before presenting the gospel of Jesus. In the mid-1980s he formulated two sermons entitled "Hell's Best Kept Secret" and "True and False Conversions."

Comfort speaks professionally at churches and evangelism seminars, and preaches in Huntington Beach, California. As well as co-hosting the former The Way of the Master Radio with Kirk Cameron, he is co-host of The Way of the Master Television Show.

In 2006, Comfort recorded a segment for The Way of the Master's television show in which he argued that the banana was "the atheist's nightmare", arguing that it displayed many user-friendly features that were evidence of intelligent design. Comfort retracted the video and claims upon learning that the banana is a result of artificial selection by humans, and that the wild banana is small and unpalatable.

Debates

On 13 April 2001, Comfort appeared at the 27th National Convention of American Atheists in Orlando, Florida, where he debated Ron Barrier, the National Spokesperson for American Atheists. Comfort later stated that "they laughed at my humor, and although there was unified mockery at some of the things that I said, I was able to go through the Ten Commandments, the fact of Judgment Day, the reality of Hell, the Cross, and the necessity of repentance, and no one stopped me."

On 5 May 2007, Comfort and Cameron participated in a televised debate with Brian Sapient and Kelly O'Connor of the Rational Response Squad, at Calvary Baptist Church in Manhattan. The debate, which was moderated by Nightline correspondent Martin Bashir, focused on the existence of God, which Comfort claimed he could prove scientifically without relying on the Bible. During the debate, Cameron and Comfort repeatedly referenced the Ten Commandments and denied the theory of evolution.

Publications

Tracts

According to Comfort, he has designed dozens of gospel tracts since the 1970s, and sells millions of Living Waters tracts each year. Some of his tracts are designed to resemble paper money, including fake $100, $1,000 and $1 million bills. Others employ novelties intended to amuse, such as a "ticket to heaven" that invites the reader to tear it if they do not need it; the ticket is printed on a type of plastic, making it difficult to rip. The tracts typically attempt to persuade the reader that on judgment day, they will certainly be found guilty of breaking one or more of the Ten Commandments, and therefore will be sent to hell, unless they say a prayer to acknowledge Christ's substitutionary atonement.

In June 2006, agents of the US Secret Service confiscated thousands of Ray Comfort's "Million Dollar Bill" gospel tracts from Darrel Rundus, president of Great News Network. A federal district court judge ruled that the tracts, which were marked as "not legal tender", did not violate federal law and ordered their return.

In October 2010, The New Zealand Herald reported that elderly people received "appointment cards" by Comfort's California-based publishing company, Living Waters, asking them to fill out information regarding the date and time of their deaths, and advising them to contact evangelists in order to avoid hell. Recipients of these cards expressed anger and horror over receiving them, and contacted police over the matter, with one of them commenting, "It's disgusting. It was quite spooky. I just couldn't comprehend why anyone would ask you to predict the date of your death." The New Zealand Herald summarized a statement from Living Waters spokesperson Lisa Law as saying that "the cards were a way of raising awareness of human mortality in order to spark discussion about Jesus", and that Law "did not know who sent [the tracts]".

Books
Ray Comfort has authored more than 80 books and tracts. His 2009 book You Can Lead an Atheist to Evidence, But You Can't Make Him Think, ranked #1 in Amazon.com's atheism and apologetics categories when it debuted in February 2009.

Abridged version of On the Origin of Species
In November 2009, Comfort released an edited and abridged version of Charles Darwin's On the Origin of Species, with a 50-page foreword containing creationist arguments against the theory of evolution. The book was given away for free at selected schools around the United States. Stan Guffey, a biologist at the University of Tennessee, alleged that most of Comfort's foreword was plagiarised from Darwin himself.

According to Comfort's website, "nothing has been removed from Darwin's original work", but Eugenie C. Scott, executive director of the National Center for Science Education (NCSE), noted that Comfort deleted four chapters by Darwin that described the evidence for evolution, adding that two of the omitted chapters, Chapters 11 and 12, showcased biogeography, some of Darwin's strongest evidence for evolution. She wrote that Comfort's foreword is "a hopeless mess of long-ago-refuted creationist arguments, teeming with misinformation about the science of evolution, populated by legions of strawmen, and exhibiting what can be charitably described as muddled thinking".

On his website, Comfort said that the four chapters were chosen at random to be omitted in order to make the book small enough to be affordable as a giveaway, with the absent chapters available for download, and that the missing chapters were included in the second edition, which had a smaller text size that made printing the entire book as a giveaway affordable. The second edition still lacks Darwin's preface and glossary of terms. The NCSE arranged a campaign at colleges across the US to distribute an analysis of the Comfort introduction, a one-page flier, and "the NCSE Safety Bookmark" in the shape of a banana, a reference to Comfort's flawed presentation of the banana as an argument for the existence of God.

List of books published

Film

In 2011, Comfort wrote and produced a 33-minute documentary film called 180: Changing the Heart of a Nation. The film was criticized by The Huffington Post for its comparison of legalized abortion to the Holocaust.

Comfort's 2016 film The Atheist Delusion premiered at the Ark Encounter, a Christian theme park operated by the young Earth creationist organization Answers in Genesis on 22 October 2016.

Filmography
 The Secrets of Nostradamus Exposed (1995): Writer, producer
 True Fiction (1999): Writer
 The Way of the Master series (2003–14): Self – Host, writer, producer
 180: Changing the Heart of a Nation (2011): Self, writer, producer
 Genius (2012): Self, writer, director
 Evolution vs. God: Shaking the Foundations of Faith (2013): Self, director
 Noah and the Last Days (2014): Director, producer, writer, self, runner, sound
 Audacity (2015): Writer, executive producer
 The Atheist Delusion (2016): Executive producer 
 Exit: The Appeal of Suicide (2017): Narrator, Writer, Executive producer
7 Reasons (2019): Self, executive producer

References

External links

 Ray Comfort's section of the official Living Waters website
 The Comfort Zone – Ray Comfort's blog
 The Way of the Master – Website for his ministry with Kirk Cameron
 

1949 births
Living people
20th-century American male writers
20th-century American non-fiction writers
20th-century evangelicals
21st-century American male writers
21st-century American non-fiction writers
21st-century evangelicals
American evangelicals
American evangelists
American male non-fiction writers
American people of Jewish descent
Christian apologists
Christian Young Earth creationists
Converts to Christianity from atheism or agnosticism
Critics of atheism
Evangelical writers
New Zealand Christians
New Zealand Christian missionaries
New Zealand emigrants to the United States
New Zealand evangelicals
New Zealand evangelists
New Zealand Jews
New Zealand people of Jewish descent
Open-air preaching
People from Christchurch
People from Greater Los Angeles